"Fotografía" (English: Photograph) is a song recorded by Juanes and Nelly Furtado for Juanes' second studio album, Un Día Normal (2002).

The duet, which was followed by another ("Te Busqué" on Furtado's 2006 studio album, Loose), was extremely commercially successful: it reached number one on the U.S. Billboard Hot Latin Tracks chart.

In 2012 Juanes recorded a new duet with Emanuela Bellezza for inclusion on the Deluxe Edition of his album Juanes MTV Unplugged.

Remixes
 "Fotografia" (Hessler's Remix)
 "Fotografia" (Hessler's Radio Remix)
 "Fotografia" (DJ Enzo Remix)
 "Fotografia" (Gianina Mix)
 "Fotografia" (Base Mix)
 "Fotografia" (ON Remix)

Other versions
 "Fotografia" (Instrumental Version)

Chart performance

Certifications

References

2003 singles
2002 songs
Juanes songs
Nelly Furtado songs
Songs written by Juanes
Number-one singles in Spain
Spanish-language songs
Male–female vocal duets
2000s ballads
Pop ballads
Rock ballads
Song recordings produced by Gustavo Santaolalla